is a town located in Tokachi Subprefecture, Hokkaido, Japan.

As of April 30, 2017, the town has an estimated population of 18,806 and a density of 37 persons per km2. The total area is 513.91 km2.

The Hokkaido Prefectural Tokachi Agricultural Experiment Station is located in Memuro.

Climate

Sister city
Memuro is the sister city of:
 Tracy, California, United States

References

External links

Official Website 

Towns in Hokkaido